Amir Hossein Arman is an Iranian actor, singer and model born on November 5, 1982 in Tehran, Iran.

Biography
He graduated in the field of Interior Decoration Design. 
Amir Hossein Arman attended theater classes in Iran before embarking on his artistic career. He started his professional career with playing a role in the movie Marriage, Iranian Style  directed by Hassan Fathi in 2004. He has performed as a singer in various productions.

Arman, also has acted in several TV series, such as Kimia and Paria; which made him more famous than before.
In his acting career, Arman has main roles and complementary roles in different genres such as drama, romance, Mysterious crime and humor genre, which has proven to be a capable actor during his years of artistic activity.
In 2021, Amirhossein Arman had the most different role in the "Red Square series", which appeared with a different face and style.

Amir Hossein loves nature and off-road trips. He travels when he has free time and prefers to be away from the city. He is an "honorary environmentalist".

Films

Home media

TV series

Advertising and modeling activities 
In addition to acting, Amirhossein has collaborated with some brands in the field of modeling. After starring in the home media series "Mannequin", he was invited as a model for a menswear manufacturer. His advertising billboards had shown in the city streets moreover he starred T.V. teasers for that brand. Those teasers were broadcast on TV every day that year. His contract was for about a year, and after that, when he starred in the series "Red Square", he was selected as an advertising model for another brand, but second brand did not have T.V. teasers and all of collaborates was exclusively had shown in the medias of that brand.

Songs
Amirhossein started singing professionally with the song "Towards you" that released in 2013.

The first Live singing took place on September 19, 2016, in Celebration of Cinema critics. 
He also performed on 3stars TV in March 2017 and on plus1 TV in December 2017. On December 23, 2017he sang live "Dele Divaneh" during playback of "The Yalda night" in Kourosh cinema.

Awards and nominations

References

External links 

Iranian artists
1982 births
Iranian male actors
21st-century Iranian male singers
Singers from Tehran
Living people